Vanessa Noelle Kiomegne Djomo (born 25 December 1998), also known as Vanessa Djomo or Kiomegne Djomo Vanessa, is a Cameroonian football midfielder, who plays for Kdz. Ereğli Belediye Spor in the Turkish Women's Super League with jersey number 8.

Club career 
Djomo has played for Louves Minproff based in Yaoundé in her country between 2015 and 2021. In October 2016, the team she captained won the champions title of the Cameroonian Women's Cup. In November 2018, she enjoyed her team's champins title of the Cameroonian Women's Cup again. In the 2020-21 season of the Guinness Super League, her team runners-up.ç

In January 2021, Djome went to Nepal to play with three other women's footballers from her country for the Waling Municipality Club in the 2021 National Women's League of Nepal.

In December 2021, Djomo moved to Turkey, and joined Ankara BB Fomget GS to play in the Women's Super League. She scored  two goals in eleven matches of the 2021-22 league season. In the league's second half, she transferred to Kdz. Ereğli Belediye Spor.

International career 
In March 2016, she was selected to the Cameroon women's national football team to play in a preparation game for the ongoing 2016 Women's Africa Cup of Nations.

Djomo was admitted to the Cameroon women's national under-17 football team, and took part at the 2018 FIFA U-17 Women's World Cup held in Uruguay.

Honours 
 Cameroonian Women's Cup
 Louves Minproff
 Winners (2): 2016, 2018

 Guinness Super League
 Louves Minproff
 Runners-up (1): 2020-21

References 

1998 births
Living people
Cameroonian women's footballers
Women's association football midfielders
Cameroon women's international footballers
Cameroonian expatriate women's footballers
Expatriate footballers in Nepal
Cameroonian expatriate sportspeople in Turkey
Expatriate women's footballers in Turkey
Turkish Women's Football Super League players
Karadeniz Ereğlispor players